The 2005 NCAA Men's Water Polo Championship was the 37th annual NCAA Men's Water Polo Championship to determine the national champion of NCAA men's collegiate water polo. Tournament matches were played at the Kinney Natatorium at Bucknell University in Lewisburg, Pennsylvania from December 3–4, 2005.

USC defeated Stanford in the final, 3–2, to win their third national title. The Trojans (26–1) were coached by Jovan Vavic.

The Most Outstanding Players of the tournament were Adam Shilling and Juraj Zatovic from USC. Additionally, two All-Tournament Teams were named: a First Team (with seven players including Shilling and Zatovic) and a Second Team (with eight players).

The tournament's leading scorer, with 5 goals, was Cutberto Hernandez from Loyola Marymount.

Qualification
Since there has only ever been one single national championship for water polo, all NCAA men's water polo programs (whether from Division I, Division II, or Division III) were eligible. A total of 4 teams were invited to contest this championship.

Bracket
Site: Kinney Natatorium, Lewisburg, Pennsylvania

All-tournament teams

First Team 
Adam Shilling, USC (Most outstanding player)
Juraj Zatovic, USC (Most outstanding player)
Juan Delgadillo, USC
Thomas Hale, USC
Thomas Hopkins, Stanford
Endre Rex-Kiss, Loyola Marymount
Peter Varellas, Stanford

Second Team 
Tommy Corcoran, USC
Ian Elliott, Loyola Marymount
Gergely Fabian, St. Francis Brooklyn
J.J. Garton, Stanford
Will Hindle-Katel, Stanford
Sandy Hohener, Stanford
Bogdon Petrovic, St. Francis Brooklyn
Botond Szalma, St. Francis Brooklyn

See also 
 NCAA Men's Water Polo Championship
 NCAA Women's Water Polo Championship

References

NCAA Men's Water Polo Championship
NCAA Men's Water Polo Championship
2005 in sports in Pennsylvania
December 2005 sports events in the United States
2005